Paul Andrew Owen (9 June 1969 – 10 June 2020) was a Canadian cricketer. Owen was a right-handed batsman who bowled slow left-arm orthodox.

Owen, who had been educated at Bedford Modern School, began his county cricket career in England with Bedfordshire, making his debut for the county in the 1989 Minor Counties Championship against Norfolk.  In 1990 he joined Gloucestershire, making three first-class appearances in that season against Yorkshire, Northamptonshire, and Surrey.  A bowler, Owen took 4 wickets at an average of 59.75, with best figures of 2/37.  1990 was his only season with Gloucestershire, the following year he returned to playing Minor counties cricket for Bedfordshire. He played for the county until 1996, making a total of 29 Minor Counties Championship appearances.

References

External links
Paul Owen at ESPNcricinfo
Paul Owen at CricketArchive

1969 births
2020 deaths
People educated at Bedford Modern School
Sportspeople from Regina, Saskatchewan
Cricketers from Saskatchewan
Canadian cricketers
Bedfordshire cricketers
Gloucestershire cricketers
Canadian expatriate sportspeople in England